Yawriq (Quechua yawri a big needle, -q a suffix, Hispanicized spelling Yauric) is a  mountain in the Cordillera Central in the Andes of Peru. It lies in the Lima Region, Huarochirí Province, on the border of the districts of Huarochirí and San Mateo. Yawriq is situated northeast of Suyruqucha.

References

Mountains of Peru
Mountains of Lima Region